Günther Tribukait (sometimes referred to as Tribukeit or Tribukayt) was a German officer in the Wehrmacht during World War II and recipient of the Knight's Cross of the Iron Cross. After the war, Tribukait was tried for war crimes in Yugoslavia; he was convicted and executed in 1947.

Trial and execution
Towards the end of the war, Tribukait was taken prisoner by the Yugoslav Partisans. The 118th Jäger Division – and other Mountain and Jäger divisions as well – were involved in numerous war crimes throughout the Balkans, carrying out, among others, harsh retaliations against the civilian population, especially Serbs and Greeks. Until his trial, he was held in a POW camp at the outskirts of Belgrade.

Tribukait had the lowest rank of the defendants of the fourth process of the Yugoslav War Crimes Trials Proceedings (5–16 February 1947). He was tried along with six other major war criminals: Generaloberst Alexander Löhr (commander-in-chief of Army Group E), Generalleutnant Josef Kübler, Johann Fortner and Fritz Neidholdt, Generalmajor Adalbert Lontschar and the SS-Brigadeführer August Schmidthuber. All of the defendants were found guilty of "mass executions of non-combatants, especially of women and children, destruction and razing of homes, kidnapping of Yugoslav civilians to concentration camps and torture and murder of POWs."

All of them were sentenced to death. According to a witness, Löhr and the six other convicts were imprisoned again in the POW camp outside of Belgrade – evidently, Löhr spent his last hours "in a small prison cell, bound in chains and wearing only his underwear". During the night of 25/26 February 1947, ten convicts – among them Tribukait – were picked up by a truck and were driven to the place of execution, where they were executed by hanging in the early hours of 26 February 1947.

Awards

Knight's Cross of the Iron Cross on 8 February 1943 as Major and commander of Jäger-Battalion 5

References

Sources

1909 births
1947 deaths
People from Greifswald
Recipients of the Knight's Cross of the Iron Cross
Recipients of the Gold German Cross
Executed people from Mecklenburg-Western Pomerania
Nazis executed by Yugoslavia by hanging
People from the Province of Pomerania
Military personnel from Mecklenburg-Western Pomerania
German people convicted of war crimes